Nelson Township is one of the eighteen townships of Portage County, Ohio, United States.  The 2020 census found 3,101 people in the township.

Geography
Located in the northeastern corner of the county, it borders the following other townships and municipalities:
Parkman Township, Geauga County - north
Farmington Township, Trumbull County - northeast corner
Southington Township, Trumbull County - east
Braceville Township, Trumbull County - southeast corner
Windham Township - south
Hiram Township - west
Troy Township, Geauga County - northwest corner

Most of the village of Garrettsville was formed from southwestern Nelson Township.

Name and history
Nelson Township was organized in 1817. The name most likely is a transfer from Nelson, New York. It is the only Nelson Township statewide.

Culture
Nelson Township is the site of Nelson Kennedy Ledges State Park, a  park featuring several rock formations that includes hiking trails, waterfalls, and picnicking areas.  Also in the township is the Nelson Ledges Road Course hosts motorcycle and sports car racing events.  Nelson has hosted many music festivals at Nelson Ledges Quarry Park from 1972–Present

Government
The township is governed by a three-member board of trustees, who are elected in November of odd-numbered years to a four-year term beginning on the following January 1. Two are elected in the year after the presidential election and one is elected in the year before it. There is also an elected township fiscal officer, who serves a four-year term beginning on April 1 of the year after the election, which is held in November of the year before the presidential election. Vacancies in the fiscal officership or on the board of trustees are filled by the remaining trustees.

References

External links
County website

Townships in Portage County, Ohio
Townships in Ohio
Populated places established in 1817
1817 establishments in Ohio